Avinash Chander is an Indian scientist who was Scientific Adviser to the Defence Minister, the Director General of Defence Research and Development Organisation (DRDO), and Secretary, Department of Defence Research and Development. He had succeeded V. K. Saraswat to this post.

He is the chief architect of the Agni series of ballistic missile systems. Chander is a recipient of the Padma Shri from the Government of India

Education 
Chander joined DRDO after completing his training in Electrical Engineering from Indian Institute of Technology Delhi (IIT Delhi). He subsequently pursued an MS in Spatial Information Technology and Doctorate from Jawaharlal Nehru Technological University, Hyderabad (JNTU, Hyderabad).

Leaving DRDO 
After completion of 42 years of Distinguished Service in DRDO, on 14 January 2015, the Department of Personnel and Training advised his contract as Chief of DRDO was to finish on 31 January 2015.

Awards
Chander is recipient of numerous awards, some of which are listed below:
 IIT Delhi Alumni Award
 Padma Shri
 DRDO Scientist of the year, 1989
 Astronautical Society of India Award, 1997
 Awarded by Dr. R. Chidambaram, Principal Scientific Advisor to Govt. of India.
 AGNI Self-Reliance Award, 1999
 Dr. Biren Roy Space Science Award, 2000
 DRDO Award, 2007
 Outstanding Technologist Award, 2008
 DRDO Technology Leadership Award, 2008
 Fellow, Indian National Academy of Engineers
 Fellow, System Society of India
 Fellow, Andhra Pradesh Academy of Sciences
 Vice-president, Astronautical Society of India
 Chairman – Sensors Research Society, India
 Aryabhata Award - Astronautical Society of India.
 Eminent Engineer Award, The Institute of Engineers (India) 2016.

References

Jawaharlal Nehru University alumni
Living people
Recipients of the Padma Shri in science & engineering
Defence Research and Development Organisation
Engineers from Andhra Pradesh
Indian military engineers
20th-century Indian engineers
Year of birth missing (living people)